Darío Luis Felman (born 25 October 1951) is a retired Argentine football striker who won the Copa Libertadores and Intercontinental Cup with Boca Juniors in 1977.

Club career
Felman started his career at Gimnasia y Esgrima de Mendoza in 1970 and is considered to have been one of the best footballers ever to play for the club. In 1974, he joined Independiente Rivadavia.

In 1975, he joined Boca Juniors and in 1976 he was part of the team that won back to back championships. The following season Boca went on to win the Copa Libertadores 1977 and he scored a goal in their 3–0 win over Borussia Mönchengladbach to win the Copa Intercontinental.

In 1978 Felman joined Valencia of Spain where he played alongside fellow Argentine Mario Kempes. In 1979, he was part of the Valencia squad that won the Copa del Rey and in 1980 the club won the UEFA Cup Winners' Cup and the UEFA Super Cup.

In 1984 Felman returned to Argentina and his first team Gimnasia y Esgrima de Mendoza.

International career
In 1976 Felman joined up with Menotti's Selección del Interior and in 1977 he played against Hungary alongside a young Diego Maradona who was making his international debut.

Managerial career
Felman had a brief spell as manager of Independiente Rivadavia, since then he has worked as assistant to Chino Benítez at Boca Juniors and Municipal of Guatemala.

Titles
Boca Juniors
 Argentine Primera División: Metropolitano 1976, Nacional 1976
 Copa Libertadores: 1977
 Intercontinental Cup: 1977

Valencia
 Copa del Rey: 1978–79
 UEFA Cup Winners' Cup: 1979–80
 UEFA Super Cup: 1980

Notes

External links

Informe Xeneize biography 
Es un Lobo de raza at Olé 

1951 births
Living people
Sportspeople from Mendoza, Argentina
Argentine footballers
Argentina international footballers
Association football forwards
Independiente Rivadavia footballers
Boca Juniors footballers
Valencia CF players
Copa Libertadores-winning players
Argentine Primera División players
Argentine people of German descent
La Liga players
Argentine expatriate footballers
Expatriate footballers in Spain
Argentine football managers
Independiente Rivadavia managers